The Van Buren County Courthouse is located at the corner of Griggs and Main Streets in downtown Clinton, Arkansas, the county seat of Van Buren County.  It is a two-story masonry structure, built primarily out of local stone.  Its main facade is five bays wide, each flanked by broad sections that project a small amount.  The main entrance is in the center bay, with a concrete surround of pilasters and a tall corniced entablature.  It was built in 1934 with funding support from the federal Works Progress Administration, and was the county's third courthouse to be located in Clinton.

The building was listed on the National Register of Historic Places in 1991.

See also
List of county courthouses in Arkansas
National Register of Historic Places listings in Van Buren County, Arkansas

References

Courthouses on the National Register of Historic Places in Arkansas
Government buildings completed in 1934
County courthouses in Arkansas
National Register of Historic Places in Van Buren County, Arkansas
1934 establishments in Arkansas
Works Progress Administration in Arkansas
WPA Rustic architecture
Rustic architecture in Arkansas
Art Deco architecture in Arkansas
Individually listed contributing properties to historic districts on the National Register in Arkansas